Jati is a city in the southern part of the Brazilian state of Ceará. Its population was 8,130 (2020) and its area is 353 km².

As of October 2018, the mayor of Jati is Francisca Ferreira de Souza

References

Municipalities in Ceará